Westfield Township may refer to:

Illinois
 Westfield Township, Bureau County, Illinois
 Westfield Township, Clark County, Illinois

Iowa
 Westfield Township, Fayette County, Iowa
 Westfield Township, Plymouth County, Iowa

Minnesota
 Westfield Township, Dodge County, Minnesota

North Carolina
 Westfield Township, Surry County, North Carolina

North Dakota
 Westfield Township, Steele County, North Dakota, in Steele County, North Dakota

Ohio
 Westfield Township, Medina County, Ohio
 Westfield Township, Morrow County, Ohio

Pennsylvania
 Westfield Township, Tioga County, Pennsylvania

See also
 Westfield (disambiguation)

Township name disambiguation pages